Vaassangyaan Chaudhary (born 6 December 2004), is an Indian boy, who holds two world records in mountaineering. He is a student of DPS Sonepat, Haryana.
On 6 June 2016, at 9.30 am, he scaled Mt. Stok Kangri, a 20,182 feet high peak in the Stok range of Laddakh Himalayas. For this feat of his, he was certified by the Indian Mountaineering Foundation, as the world's youngest to scale this summit, at the age of 11 years.

On 22 June 2017, at 6.30 am, Vaassangyaan Chaudhary scaled the 21,000 feet high Black Peak (also called Mt. Kala Nag), the highest peak in the Bandarpunch range of Himalayas. He again created a world record in being the youngest to scale this peak, at the age of 12 years.

Early life and education 
Vaassangyaan Chaudhary is the son of Manisha and Sandeep Chaudhary. His mother is a psychologist by education, having done her PhD in developmental psychology from the University of Delhi. His father is a chemical engineer by education, having done B.Tech. in chemical technology from the Indian Institute of Technology (I.I.T.), Delhi.

Vaassangyaan has two sisters, Manassangyini, an environment activist, and Suryassangyini Chaudhary, who holds the world record of reaching the 16,300 Khanchendjonga Base Camp, at the age of 6 years.

Vaassangyaan started his schooling at the Pathways World School, an IB school situated on the outskirts of a Delhi suburb, Gurgaon, in 2009. After two years of formal education, seeing his potential for adventure sports as well as other sports like Tennis and Horse Riding, his parents pulled him out of formal schooling, to home school him. It is during these early years, from 2011-2016, that Vaassangyaan started undertaking regular high altitude treks in the Great Himalayas.

In early 2016, he enrolled at ate Delhi Public School, Sonepat, situated in another suburb of the National Capital Region (NCR) of India. Currently, he is studying in the 8th Grade of his School.

High Altitude Treks and Mountaineering Achievements 
Till date, Vaassangyaan has successfully undertaken the following high altitude treks, for 3 of which, he has received certification of some sort as well:

Pindari Glacier Trek - Highest Point, 12,500 feet above sea level 
Year of completion - 2011
Location - Kumaon region of Himalayas
Age at the time of this trek - 6 years 11 months

Himani Chamunda Trek - Highest Point, 14,000 feet above sea level 
Year of completion - 2014
Location - Dhauladhar  region of Himalayas
Age at the time of this trek - 10 years 11 months

Khanchendjonga Base Camp Trek - Highest Point, 16,300 feet above sea level 
Year of completion - 2016
Location - Khanchendjonga National Park region, Sikkim, in Himalayas
Age at the time of this trek - 11 years 3 months
Certified by the Government of Sikkim as India's youngest to reach that point

Summit of Stok Kangri - Highest Point, 20,163 feet above sea level 
Year of completion - 2016
Location - Stok range of Himalayas, in Laddakh, Jammu & Kashmir
Age at the time of this trek - 11 years 6 months
Certified by the Indian Mountaineering Foundation as the world's youngest to scale this summit.

Summit of Mt. Kala Nag (the Black Peak) - Highest Point, 21,000 feet above sea level 
Year of completion - 2017
Location - Bandarpunch range of Garhwal Himalayas, in Uttarakhand
Age at the time of this trek - 12 years 6 months
Certified by the local Uttarakhand Administration as the world's youngest to scale this summit.

References 

Indian mountain climbers